Hibernia was the name of a number of merchant ships.

 , the ship thought to have transported the Liberty Bell from England to the U.S. in 1752.
 Hibernia, of 75 tons (bm), launched at Chester in 1768. Broken up in 1793.
 , a merchant vessel launched in 1810 that repelled a more heavily armed American privateer in 1814 in a notable single-ship action
 , ship launched in 1828 at Prince Edward's Island that sank in 1833 in the South Atlantic
 , in service with the London and North Western Railway until 1884
 , an Atlantic Royal Mail Steamship Navigation Company cable laying ship which sank in 1877.
 , a passenger ship built by Stephen & Sons, in service with Anchor Line, sank on 25 November 1868.
 , in service with the London and North Western Railway until 1915.
 , a Thames sailing barge built in 1906
 , in service with the London and North Western Railway, London, Midland and Scottish Railway and British Railways until 1949
 , in service with British Railways from 1949 to 1976
 , an Irish Sea ferry in the 1990s

See also
 , ships of the British Royal Navy

Citations and references

Citations

References
Craig, Robert, & Rupert Jarvis (1967) Liverpool Registry of Merchant Ships. (Manchester University Press for the Chetham Society), Series 3, vol. 15.

Ship names